Kristin Frogner (born 25 February 1978) is a Norwegian actress, musician and sculptor. Known for her role in Hotel Cæsar, where she played the role of Charlotte Iversen/Anker-Hansen.

Kristin Frogner lived for a while in Firenze, Italia where she studied at The Florence Academy of Art. She also studied philosophy in Bali and theatre at the Royal Academy of Dramatic Art in London.

Discography
2005: Just Another Girl

2009: Follow the Butterflies

External links
 Kristin Frogner's official home page Contains music videos and pictures of her sculptures. 
 Kristin Frogner's page on MySpace

1978 births
Living people
Norwegian soap opera actresses
Norwegian sculptors
21st-century Norwegian singers
21st-century Norwegian women singers